Gunthorpe is a village and civil parish in Nottinghamshire, England. Its population of 752 at the 2011 census was estimated at 559 in 2019. It lies on the left bank of the River Trent. Gunthorpe's on the A6097 is the only road bridge over the river between Newark and Nottingham.

Amenities
Gunthorpe's Anglican church, St John the Baptist's, was originally a chapel of ease built in 1850. It became a parish in its own right, separate from Lowdham, in 1993. Extensions were made in 1991 and 2001. A service is held only on the morning of the second Sunday in the month.

Gunthorpe Church of England Primary School is in David's Lane just off Main Street.

Gunthorpe has suffered from flooding by the River Trent. The need for further flood defences was argued after flooding in 2000.

Heritage
Queen Boudica is said to have defeated the Roman IX Legion near present-day Gunthorpe in the 1st century AD.

Settlement came with the Danes sailing up the Trent in the 9th century. The ferry at "Gulnetorp" appears in the 1086 Domesday Book. Further mentions occur throughout the Middle Ages. The toll bridge completed in 1875 was largely made of iron. It was replaced under powers gained in 1925 by the present bridge, which is free.

Of the 58 men of Gunthorpe who fought in the First World War, 12 were killed.

Transport
The daytime Trent Barton "Rushcliffe Villager" service links Gunthorpe with Nottingham and Bingham about once an hour on Monday to Saturday.

The nearest railway station is at Lowdham, just over a mile away. This has regular services to Nottingham and Newark and beyond.

References

Villages in Nottinghamshire
Newark and Sherwood